Julie A. Theriot (born 1967) is a microbiologist, professor at the Stanford University School of Medicine, and heads the Theriot Lab.  She was a Predoctoral Fellow and Investigator at the Howard Hughes Medical Institute.  She was a fellow at the Whitehead Institute for Biomedical Research.

She graduated from the Massachusetts Institute of Technology with a B.S. in Biology and Physics in 1988, and from the University of California, San Francisco, with a Ph.D. in Cell Biology in 1993.  Her work has investigated bacterial infections, such as Shigella, and Listeria.

Awards
 2004 MacArthur Fellows Program
 2019 Keith R. Porter Lecture
 2021 Member of the U. S. National Academy of Sciences.

Works
"Mechanism for cell shapeliness decoded from fish scales", Nature 453, xi (22 May 2008)
Physical biology of the cell, Authors Rob Phillips, Janè Kondev, Julie Theriot, Garland Science, 2008, 
"Bacterial Manipulation of the Host Cell Cytoskeleton", Cellular microbiology, Editor	Pascale Cossart, ASM Press, 2005, 
"Movement of Bacterial Pathogens Driven by Actin Polymerization", Motion analysis of living cells, Editors	David R. Soll, Deborah Wessels, Wiley-IEEE, 1998,

References

External links

 
 
 

American microbiologists
1968 births
MIT Department of Physics alumni
University of California, San Francisco alumni
Howard Hughes Medical Investigators
MacArthur Fellows
Living people
Stanford University School of Medicine faculty
Women microbiologists
Massachusetts Institute of Technology School of Science alumni
Members of the United States National Academy of Sciences